The calculus of structures is a proof calculus with deep inference for studying the structural proof theory of noncommutative logic. The calculus has since been applied to study linear logic, classical logic, modal logic, and process calculi, and many benefits are claimed to follow in these investigations from the way in which deep inference is made available in the calculus.

References

 Alessio Guglielmi (2004)., 'A System of Interaction and Structure'.  ACM Transactions on Computational Logic.
 Kai Brünnler (2004). Deep Inference and Symmetry in Classical Proofs. Logos Verlag.

External links
 Calculus of structures homepage
 CoS in Maude: page documenting implementations of logical systems in the calculus of structures, using the Maude system.

Logical calculi